The 1973 ABA Playoffs was the postseason tournament of the American Basketball Association's 1972-1973 season. The tournament concluded with the Western Division champion Indiana Pacers defeating the Eastern Division champion Kentucky Colonels, four games to three in the ABA Finals.

Notable events

The teams with the three best records in the ABA that year failed to win the championship.  The Carolina Cougars had the league's best record at 57-27 (.679), one game ahead of the Kentucky Colonels (56-28, .667) in the Eastern Division.  The Utah Stars won the Western Division with a record of 55-29 (.655), four games ahead of the Indiana Pacers, who won the league championship after posting a regular season record of 51-33 (.607).

The Pacers became the first team to win a third ABA championship.

The Colonels became the first team to lose two separate ABA championship series.  The series also marked the second time in three years that the Colonels lost the ABA finals 4 games to 3; the same happened at the end of the 1971 ABA Playoffs against the Utah Stars.

Two years after the 1973 finals the Colonels and Pacers would meet again at the end of the 1975 ABA Playoffs with the Colonels winning the championship series.

The Pacers' George McGinnis was the Most Valuable Player of the ABA playoffs.

Western Division

Champion:  Indiana Pacers

Division Semifinals

(1) Utah Stars vs. (4) San Diego Conquistadors:
Stars win series 4-0
Game 1 @ Utah:  Utah 107, San Diego 93
Game 2 @ Utah:  Utah 103, San Diego 92
Game 3 @ San Diego:  Utah 97, San Diego 96
Game 4 @ San Diego:  Utah 120, San Diego 98

(2) Indiana Pacers vs. (3) Denver Rockets:
Pacers win series 4-1
Game 1 @ Indiana:  Indiana 114, Denver 91
Game 2 @ Indiana:  Indiana 106, Denver 93
Game 3 @ Denver:  Denver 105, Indiana 94
Game 4 @ Denver:  Indiana 97, Denver 95
Game 5 @ Indiana:  Indiana 121, Denver 107

Division Finals

(1) Utah Stars vs. (2) Indiana Pacers:
Pacers win series 4-2
Game 1 @ Utah:  Utah 124, Indiana 107
Game 2 @ Utah:  Indiana 116, Utah 110
Game 3 @ Indiana:  Indiana 118, Utah 108
Game 4 @ Indiana:  Utah 104, Indiana 103
Game 5 @ Utah:  Indiana 104, Utah 102
Game 6 @ Indiana:  Indiana 107, Utah 98

Eastern Division

Champion:  Kentucky Colonels

Division Semifinals

(1) Carolina Cougars vs. (4) New York Nets:
Cougars win series 4-1
Game 1 @ Carolina:  Carolina 104, New York 96
Game 2 @ Carolina:  New York 114, Carolina 111
Game 3 @ New York:  Carolina 101, New York 91
Game 4 @ New York:  Carolina 112, New York 108
Game 5 @ Carolina:  Carolina 136, New York 113

(2) Kentucky Colonels vs. (3) Virginia Squires:
Colonels win series 4-1
Game 1 @ Kentucky:  Kentucky 129, Virginia 101
Game 2 @ Kentucky:  Virginia 109, Kentucky 94
Game 3 @ Virginia:  Kentucky 115, Virginia 113
Game 4 @ Virginia:  Kentucky 108, Virginia 90
Game 5 @ Kentucky:  Kentucky 114, Virginia 103

Division Finals

(1) Carolina Cougars vs. (2) Kentucky Colonels:
Colonels win series 4-3
Game 1 @ Carolina:  Kentucky 113, Carolina 103
Game 2 @ Carolina:  Carolina 125, Kentucky 105
Game 3 @ Kentucky:  Kentucky 108, Carolina 94
Game 4 @ Kentucky:  Carolina 102, Kentucky 91
Game 5 @ Carolina:  Carolina 112, Kentucky 107
Game 6 @ Kentucky:  Kentucky 119, Carolina 100
Game 7 @ Carolina:  Kentucky 107, Carolina 96

ABA Finals

(2) Kentucky Colonels VS. (2) Indiana Pacers:
Pacers win series 4-3
Game 1 (Apr 28) @ Kentucky:  Indiana 111, Kentucky 107
Game 2 (Apr 30) @ Kentucky:  Kentucky 114, Indiana 102
Game 3 (May 3) @ Indiana:  Kentucky 92, Indiana 88
Game 4 (May 5) @ Indiana:  Indiana 90, Kentucky 86
Game 5 (May 8) @ Kentucky:  Indiana 89, Kentucky 86
Game 6 (May 10) @ Indiana:  Kentucky 109, Indiana 93
Game 7 (May 12) @ Kentucky:  Indiana 88, Kentucky 81

References

External links
RememberTheABA.com page on 1973 ABA playoffs
Basketball-Reference.com's 1973 ABA Playoffs page

Playoffs
American Basketball Association playoffs